Roachville may refer to:

Roachville, Kentucky, a community in Green County
Roachville, California, a mining settlement in Inyo County